Claude Berkeley Williamson (November 18, 1926 – July 16, 2016) was an American jazz pianist.

Williamson was born in Brattleboro, Vermont, United States. He studied at the New England Conservatory of Music before moving to jazz, influenced mainly by Teddy Wilson, then by Al Haig and Bud Powell. In 1947, he moved to California, working first with Teddy Edwards, then with Red Norvo in San Francisco, with Charlie Barnet in 1949, and with June Christy for two years. Later he worked with Max Roach, Art Pepper and others. Williamson was a longtime member of the Lighthouse All-Stars (substituting for pianist Russ Freeman), performing with Bud Shank, Stan Levey, Bob Cooper, Conte Candoli and Howard Rumsey. In 1956, he became the piano player in the Bud Shank quartet. In 1968, he started working as a pianist for NBC, first on The Andy Williams Show, then for Sonny and Cher. In 1978, Williamson went back to the jazz world and released many albums, mainly for Japanese labels, often accompanied by Sam Jones and Roy Haynes. In 1995 he made a trio recording for Fresh Sound Records at the Jazz Bakery in Los Angeles.

His younger brother was trumpeter Stu Williamson (1933–1991).

He died on July 16, 2016, at the age of 89.

Discography
 1954 Kenton Presents Jazz: Claude Williamson
 1955 Key West
 1956  'Round Midnight (Bethlehem)
 1956 Claude Williamson (Bethlehem) (re-released under title Have Piano Can't Travel by Starday-King Records)
 1958 Claude Williamson Mulls the Mulligan Scene (Criterion)
 1958 In Italy (Broadway International)
 1961 The Fabulous Claude Williamson Trio (3D)
 1962 Theatre Party (Contract)
 1977 Stella by Starlight (Interplay)
 1978 Blues in Front (Storyville)
 1979 La Fiesta
 1981 Holography (Interplay)
 1981 New Departure (Interplay)
 1981 Tribute to Bud (Eastworld)
 1983 Claude Reigns (Interplay)
 1987 Live! "The Sermon" (Fresh Sound)
 1988 Standards (Interplay)
 1990 Memories of West Coast (Interplay)
 1990 Standards, Vol. 2 (Interplay)
 1991 As Time Goes By (Interplay)
 1992 South of the Border, West of the Sun (Venus)
 1995 Hallucinations (VSOP)
 1995 Live at the Jazz Bakery (Fresh Sound)
 2001 Collaboration 93 (Interplay)
 2002 Song for My Father (Venus)
 2005 Trio/Round Midnight (Bethlehem)
 2006 Blue Minor (Pony Canyon)
 2006 Claude Williamson Trio (EMI)
 2008 Cleopatra's Dream (M&I)

With Chet Baker
 Witch Doctor (Contemporary, 1953 [1985])
 Theme Music from "The James Dean Story" (World Pacific, 1956)
With Maynard Ferguson
 Jam Session featuring Maynard Ferguson (EmArcy, 1954)
With Stan Kenton
 Stan Kenton Conducts the Los Angeles Neophonic Orchestra (Capitol, 1965)
With Barney Kessel
 Kessel Plays Standards (Contemporary, 1954)
 Music to Listen to Barney Kessel By (Contemporary, 1956)
With Spokes Mashiyane
 Kwela Claude (Trutone Records/Quality, 1958)
With Gerry Mulligan and Johnny Hodges
 Gerry Mulligan Meets Johnny Hodges (Verve, 1959)
With Art Pepper
 Surf Ride (Savoy, 1952–1954 [1956])
With Dizzy Reece and Ted Curson
 Blowin' Away (Interplay, 1978)
With Pete Rugolo
 Introducing Pete Rugolo (Columbia, 1954)
 Adventures in Rhythm (Columbia, 1954)
 Rugolomania (Columbia, 1955)
 New Sounds by Pete Rugolo (Harmony, 1954–55, [1957])
 An Adventure in Sound: Brass in Hi-Fi (Mercury, 1956 [1958])
 Rugolo Plays Kenton (EmArcy, 1958)
 10 Trombones Like 2 Pianos (Mercury, 1960)
With Bud Shank
 Strings & Trombones (Pacific Jazz, 1954–55)
 Jazz at Cal-Tech (Pacific Jazz, 1956) with Bob Cooper
 The Bud Shank Quartet (Pacific Jazz, 1956)
 Bud Shank Quartet Featuring Claude Williamson (Pacific Jazz, 1956)
 Bud Shank Plays Tenor (Pacific Jazz, 1957 [1960])
 Blowin' Country (World Pacific, 1958)
 I'll Take Romance (World Pacific, 1958)

References

External links
 [ All Music]

1926 births
2016 deaths
New England Conservatory alumni
American jazz pianists
American male pianists
West Coast jazz pianists
People from Brattleboro, Vermont
American male jazz musicians